"I Think It's Going to Rain Today" (or "I Think It's Gonna Rain Today") is a song by American singer-songwriter Randy Newman. It appears on Julius La Rosa's 1966 album You're Gonna Hear from Me, Eric Burdon's 1967 album Eric Is Here, on Newman's 1968 debut album Randy Newman, in The Randy Newman Songbook Vol. 1 (2003), and in Newman's official and bootleg live albums. It is one of his most covered songs.

Background
Newman told Rolling Stone that he wrote the song around 1963 or 1964. He went on to say that the "music is emotional – even beautiful – and the lyrics are not." Newman also said that the song bothered him due to the darkness and that the song felt "sophomoric" and "too maudlin".

Newman stated in 2017 that he  had signed away the publishing rights on his first album and as a result, does not see any money from people doing covers of those songs.

Tom Northcott version

The song was covered by Canadian folk-rock artist Tom Northcott in 1970. It was released in 1971 as the second single from his debut album, Upside Downside. The song reached number 46 in Canada and number 17 on the Canadian Adult Contemporary chart.

Charts

UB40 version

The song was covered by British reggae band UB40 in 1980. It was released in June 1980 as the second and final single from their debut album, Signing Off. The song reached number 6 in the UK. The UB40 single was a double A-side with "My Way of Thinking", which was the first-named track and received most of the radio airplay. However, the German single (which appeared later) had "I Think It's Going to Rain Today" as the A-side.

Charts

Other cover versions
The song was covered numerous times by a variety of artists, especially during the late 1960s and early 1970s.

In popular culture
Bette Midler included the song in her film Beaches (1988) and it appears in the soundtrack recording. A portion of Claudine Longet's version of the song is played in the Episode 22, Season Five of the Gilmore Girls, "A House is Not a Home."  The song is also featured in the TV series Designated Survivor in the episode, "Two Ships". Nina Simone's version of the song's first verse was the opening theme for the BBC One series Broken. Simone's version also appears in the "Spies Like Us" episode from season two of the TV series Scandal. A short excerpt of the song is played in the final episode of the Childhood's End miniseries.

References

Songs about weather
1966 songs
1968 singles
1971 singles
Randy Newman songs
Songs written by Randy Newman
1980 singles
UB40 songs
Song recordings produced by Lenny Waronker
Reprise Records singles
Uni Records singles